Bezanson is a hamlet in northern Alberta, Canada within the County of Grande Prairie No. 1.

History 
Born near Halifax, Nova Scotia September 1, 1878, A. M. Bezanson (Ancel Maynard) had come to the Peace River Country in 1906. On returning to Edmonton he published a pamphlet, 'The Peace River Trail', in May 1907 in an effort to increase interest in the area. He settled near the junction of the Wapiti, Smoky, and Simonette rivers in 1908 and started a settlement there.  
Bezanson was established in 1910, when it was expected that the Grande Prairie-Grande Cache Railway would pass through the region. The settlement grew until 1914, when it was found that the railway would pass to the north through Rycroft. The townsite was moved to be near the highway. A campsite and historical markers are at the original townsite  to the southeast.

A ferry was opened in 1915 across the Smoky River. The first bridge over the river was built in 1949, near where the highway from Grande Prairie to Edmonton passed through the settlement. It was detoured in 2001, with the twinning of Highway 43 and the opening of the new Smoky River bridge.

Geography 
The nearby Kleskun Hills are the northernmost badlands in Canada and contain one of the few unbroken areas of the original prairie.

Demographics 

See also 
Besançon, a city in France
Kleskunsaurus
List of communities in Alberta
List of designated places in Alberta
List of hamlets in Alberta

References

External links 
Old Bezanson Townsite (County of Grande Prairie No. 1)
 Kleskun Hill Natural Area

County of Grande Prairie No. 1
Designated places in Alberta
Hamlets in Alberta